The Campeonato Rondoniense is the football league of the state of Rondônia, Brazil. Between 1945 and 1990, the league was an amateur competition. The professional league started in 1991.

Format

First Division

First stage: double round-robin, in which all teams play each other home-and-away games.
Second stage: home-and-away playoffs with the top 4 teams of the first stage.

The winner of the second stage is crowned the champion.

The team last placed in the first stage is relegated to the second division.

As in any other Brazilian soccer championship, the format can change every year.

Clubs 

First Division

Barcelona-RO Futebol Clube 
Ji-Paraná Futebol Clube 
Sociedade Esportiva União Cacoalense
 Sport Club Genus de Porto Velho
Clube Atlético Pimentense
Guajará Esporte Clube 
Guaporé Futebol Clube
Porto Velho Esporte Clube
 Real Ariquemes Esporte Clube
Rondoniense Social Clube
Vilhenense Esportivo Clube

Second Division

Cruzeiro Esporte Clube
Sociedade Esportiva Ariquemes
Clube Recreativo Esportivo Jaruense 
Armazém Morumbi Futebol Clube 
Moto Esporte Clube
Rolim de Moura Esporte Clube

List of champions

Amateur era

Liga de Futebol de Porto Velho

Liga de Futebol de Rondônia

Professional era

Titles by team 

Teams in bold stills active.

By city

External links 
 FFER Official Website
 List of Champions - FFER
 RSSSF

Rondoniense
Football in Rondônia